The 1939 New York Giants season was the franchise's 57th season. The team finished in fifth place in the National League with a 77–74 record, 18½ games behind the Cincinnati Reds.

Offseason 
 December 7, 1938: Les Powers was purchased from the Giants by the Philadelphia Phillies.

Regular season

Season standings

Record vs. opponents

Opening Day lineup

Notable transactions 
 April 10, 1939: Johnny Dickshot was purchased by the Giants from the Boston Bees.
 August 23, 1939: Jimmy Ripple was traded by the Giants to the Brooklyn Dodgers for Ray Hayworth.

Roster

Player stats

Batting

Starters by position 
Note: Pos = Position; G = Games played; AB = At bats; H = Hits; Avg. = Batting average; HR = Home runs; RBI = Runs batted in

Other batters 
Note: G = Games played; AB = At bats; H = Hits; Avg. = Batting average; HR = Home runs; RBI = Runs batted in

Pitching

Starting pitchers 
Note: G = Games pitched; IP = Innings pitched; W = Wins; L = Losses; ERA = Earned run average; SO = Strikeouts

Other pitchers 
Note: G = Games pitched; IP = Innings pitched; W = Wins; L = Losses; ERA = Earned run average; SO = Strikeouts

Relief pitchers 
Note: G = Games pitched; W = Wins; L = Losses; SV = Saves; ERA = Earned run average; SO = Strikeouts

Farm system

Notes

References 
 1939 New York Giants team page at Baseball Reference
 1939 New York Giants team page at Baseball Almanac

New York Giants (NL)
San Francisco Giants seasons
New York Giants season
New York
1930s in Manhattan
Washington Heights, Manhattan